Ophichthus singapurensis is an eel in the family Ophichthidae (worm/snake eels). It was described by Pieter Bleeker in either 1864 or 1865. It is a marine, tropical eel endemic to Singapore. However, it is also possibly found in Thailand.

References

singapurensis
Taxa named by Pieter Bleeker